Invergarry Railway Station is situated in the Highlands of Scotland at the southern end of Loch Oich, on the eastern side, and not far from the Laggan swing bridge over the Caledonian canal.

History
The station was opened on 22 July 1903. The station was provided with a water column. The company appointed James Morrison as station master. The station was operated by the Highland Railway from 1903 to 1907, and then by the North British Railway until 1922. From 1923 it was operated by the London and North Eastern Railway.

In September 1905, King Edward VII travelled over the line from Spean Bridge to Invergarry with George Cadogan, 5th Earl Cadogan and Countess Cadogan. The station at Invergarry was specially decorated for the occasion. The King was visiting Lord and Lady Burton at Glenquoich Lodge.

The station closed to passenger services on 1 December 1933, although the line remained open for goods traffic until 31 December 1946.

The station is now being restored by the Invergarry and Fort Augustus Railway Museum, and the site includes a short length of track.

References

External links
 Invergarry station on navigable O. S. map
 Invergarry Station Preservation Society
 Disused Stations - Invergarry

Disused railway stations in Highland (council area)
Former North British Railway stations
Railway stations in Great Britain opened in 1903
Railway stations in Great Britain closed in 1911
Railway stations in Great Britain opened in 1913
Railway stations in Great Britain closed in 1933